"Love Sign" is a 1994 song by Nona Gaye and Prince.

Love Sign may also refer to:
 Love Sign (horse) (foaled 1977), racehorse  
 Love Sign (album), by Free Energy, 2013

See also
 Love Signs, a 2021 album by the Jungle Giants